Major Edmund Leopold de Rothschild  (2 January 1916 – 17 January 2009) was an English financier, a member of the prominent Rothschild banking family of England, and a recipient of the Victoria Medal of Honour (VMH), given by the Royal Horticultural Society.

Life and career
Born in Westminster, London, he was the second child and first son of Lionel Nathan de Rothschild and Marie Louise Eugénie de Rothschild née Beer (1892–1975). Known as Eddy de Rothschild, he graduated from Trinity College, Cambridge, after which he traveled the world. Returning home, he worked at the N M Rothschild & Sons bank but shortly thereafter World War II broke out and he joined the British Army. An artillery officer in the Buckinghamshire Yeomanry, he served with the British Expeditionary Force in France then fought in the North African Campaign and in Italy with the 77th Field (Highland) Regiment, then became a major in the newly formed Jewish Infantry Brigade.

In May 1946 Rothschild was demobilised and once back home in England he returned to work at N M Rothschild & Sons. He became a partner, his father having died in 1942, but then had very little experience. Tutored by his uncle Anthony Gustav de Rothschild, he played a key role in the continuing success of the bank, and became its chairman from 1970 to 1975. An aggressive business developer, during his career Rothschild flew the Atlantic Ocean more than four hundred times playing a key role in developing British interests in postwar Japan and was a significant part of the Rothschild syndicate that formed the British Newfoundland Development Corporation to undertake mineral exploration in Labrador, Canada and to develop the Churchill Falls hydro-electric dam.

Over the years he was involved in a number of philanthropic causes and in recognition of his services, the New Year Honours 1997 made Rothschild a Commander of the Order of the British Empire. Still active into his nineties, he was President of the Association of Jewish Ex-Servicemen and Women (AJEX). In 1998, he appeared in the Chuck Olin documentary film titled In Our Own Hands that told the story of the only all-Jewish fighting force in World War II.

Like other members of the Rothschild family, he was an art collector, but the maintenance and development of the Exbury gardens was his most important pastime. From his father, Rothschild inherited Exbury Gardens in Hampshire which had fallen into severe disrepair as a result of the War, and he set about restoring the  gardens. Edmund's expertise became such that in the 1950s and 1960s he served on the Council of the Royal Horticultural Society. In 2001, the American Rhododendron Society in Eugene, Oregon awarded him a citation in appreciation of his many services to the horticultural world. In 2005, the Royal Horticultural Society bestowed on him the Victoria Medal of Honour, the highest accolade in the British gardening world. Rothschild established a charitable trust to manage Exbury Gardens with which his children are involved.

In 1949 he published Window on the World, an account of his world tour of 1937–39. His autobiography was published in 1998.

Private life
On 22 June 1948 Rothschild married Elizabeth Edith Lentner (1923–1980). The couple had the following children:

 Katherine Juliette (b. 1949), who married Marcus Agius
 Nicholas David (b. 1951)
 David Lionel (b. 1955) (twin)
 Charlotte Henriette (b. 1955) (twin)

Elizabeth Lentner de Rothschild died in 1980 and Edmund remarried in 1982 to Anne Kitching (1921-2012).

He died in 2009 at the age of 93.

References

External links
 Official site of the Rothschild Archive
 N M Rothschild & Sons
 Exbury Gardens

English bankers
English gardeners
English art collectors
British Army personnel of World War II
Alumni of Trinity College, Cambridge
Edmund Leopold de Rothschild
English Jews
English people of German-Jewish descent
Commanders of the Order of the British Empire
1916 births
2009 deaths
Victoria Medal of Honour recipients
Royal Artillery officers
Royal Buckinghamshire Yeomanry officers
Mandatory Palestine military personnel of World War II
Jewish Brigade personnel
20th-century English businesspeople